Hugh Prosser (March 2, 1907 – November 8, 1952) was a Hollywood actor who appeared in over 90 films between 1936 and 1953.

A native of Illinois, Prosser was a versatile supporting performer particularly adept at playing unscrupulous villains, but also satisfactory in character roles and the occasional sympathetic part. Also very prolific on early television shows, he played bit parts in some renowned films but excelled both in B-movies and several cliffhanger serials.

Prosser was killed in an automobile accident near Gallup, New Mexico at the age of 52. An Associated Press story about his accident gave his age as 46.

Selected filmography

Film

 The Millionaire Kid (1936) - Henchman (uncredited)
 Blockade (1938) - Minor Role (uncredited)
 Come On, Leathernecks! (1938) - Marine (uncredited)
 Flying G-Men (1939, Serial) - Stokes (uncredited)
 The Night Riders (1939) - Federal Man (uncredited)
 Bachelor Mother (1939) - Merlin's Chauffeur (uncredited)
 Mr. District Attorney (1941) - Barrett's Aide (uncredited)
 Lady from Louisiana (1941) - Politician (uncredited)
 Hands Across the Rockies (1941) - Cash Jennings
 The Devil Pays Off (1941) - Ship's Purser (uncredited)
 Sierra Sue (1941) - Frenchy Montague
 West of Cimarron (1941) - Charles Bentley
 Dick Tracy vs. Crime Inc. (1941, Serial) - Patrol Captain (uncredited)
 Junior G-Men of the Air (1942, Serial) - Army Lieutenant [Ch. 12] (uncredited)
 Spy Smasher (1942, Serial) - Flight 4 Squadron Leader [Ch. 7] (uncredited)
 Sabotage Squad (1942) - Saboteur (uncredited)
 Boss of Hangtown Mesa (1942) - Utah Kid
 Lost Canyon (1942) - Sheriff
 They Got Me Covered (1943) - Captain (uncredited)
 Border Patrol (1943) - Mine Boss (uncredited)
 They Came to Blow Up America (1943) - FBI Agent (uncredited)
 Action in the North Atlantic (1943) - Lieutenant Commander (uncredited)
 The Desperadoes (1943) - Lieutenant (uncredited)
 So Proudly We Hail! (1943) - Captain (uncredited)
 Northern Pursuit (1943) - Corporal (uncredited)
 Riders of the Deadline (1943) - Deputy Sheriff Martin
 Destination Tokyo (1943) - PBY Seaplane Pilot (uncredited)
 Henry Aldrich, Boy Scout (1944) - 1st Scout Master (uncredited)
 The Fighting Seabees (1944) - Seabee (uncredited)
 Range Law (1944) - Sheriff Jed Hawkins
 West of the Rio Grande (1944) - Lucky Cramer - Henchman
 Land of the Outlaws (1944) - Ed Hammond
 Song of the Range (1944) - Bruce Carter
 Double Exposure (1944) - Detective (uncredited)
 Adventures of Kitty O'Day (1945) - Nick Joel
 Dillinger (1945) - Guard (uncredited)
 Flame of Barbary Coast (1945) - Fred Mallen (uncredited)
 Code of the Lawless (1945) - Lester Ward
 Cornered (1945) - Police Assistant (uncredited)
 Pardon My Past (1945) - Mr. Long
 My Reputation (1946) - Les Hanson (uncredited)
 The Phantom Rider (1946, Serial) - Keeeler
 They Made Me a Killer (1946) - Cop at Railroad Station (uncredited)
 The French Key (1946) - Swede (uncredited)
 Suspense (1946) - Photographer (uncredited)
 Monsieur Beaucaire (1946) - Courtier (uncredited)
 Son of the Guardsman (1946, Serial) - Red Robert
 Sinbad the Sailor (1947) - Captain of Guard (uncredited)
 Vacation Days (1947) - Tom Sneed
 Jack Armstrong (1947, Serial) - Vic Hardy
 The Vigilante (1947, Serial) - Police Capt. Reilly
 Prairie Raiders (1947) - Bart Henley (uncredited)
 The Sea Hound (1947, Serial) - Stanley Rand
 Unconquered (1947) - Soldier in Gilded Beaver (uncredited)
 Dragnet (1947)
 Six-Gun Law (1948) - Decker - Boss
 Caged Fury (1948) - Ringmaster (uncredited)
 A Connecticut Yankee in King Arthur's Court (1948) - Sir Belvedere (uncredited)
 Daredevils of the Clouds (1948) - RCMP Sergeant Dickson
 Trail to Laredo (1948) - Fenton
 Congo Bill (1948, Serial) - Morelli
 The Plunderers (1948) - Fort Officer (uncredited)
 Bruce Gentry (1949, Serial) - Paul Radcliffe
 Western Renegades (1949) - (uncredited)
 Samson and Delilah (1949) - Tax Collector (uncredited)
 Adventures of Sir Galahad (1949, Serial) - Sir Lancelot
 Cody of the Pony Express (1950, Serial) - Syndicate Man (uncredited)
 The Great Jewel Robber (1950) - Captain (uncredited)
 Atom Man vs. Superman (1950, Serial) - HQ Henchman [Ch. 2] (uncredited)
 Across the Badlands (1950) - Jeff Carson
 Pirates of the High Seas (1950, Serial) - Roper - Jeff's First Mate [Chs.1-2, 5-8]
 Outlaw Gold (1950) - Roger Bigsby
 Roar of the Iron Horse - Rail-Blazer of the Apache Trail (1951, Serial) - Lefty - Henchman [Chs.1-4,7-9]
 The Texas Rangers (1951) - Bob - Texas Ranger (uncredited)
 Hurricane Island (1951) - King's Courier (uncredited)
 Mysterious Island (1951, Serial) - Gideon Spillett
 The Desert Fox: The Story of Rommel (1951) - Surgeon (uncredited)
 The Golden Horde (1951) - Samarkand Man (uncredited)
 The Greatest Show on Earth (1952) - Hugh (uncredited)
 Bend of the River (1952) - Johnson (uncredited)
 The Treasure of Lost Canyon (1952) - Fire Captain (uncredited)
 The World in His Arms (1952) - Mounted Cossack Officer (uncredited)
 The Miraculous Blackhawk: Freedom's Champion (1952) - Colonel (uncredited)
 Montana Incident (1952) - Max Martin (uncredited)
 Canyon Ambush (1952) - George Millarde
 Back at the Front (1952) - Lieutenant General in Wash Room (uncredited)
 The Prisoner of Zenda (1952) - Uhlan Guard at Hunting Lodge (uncredited)
 The Lone Hand (1953) - Regulator (uncredited)
 Take Me to Town (1953) - Logger (uncredited)
 The Beast from 20,000 Fathoms (1953) - Doctor (uncredited)
 The Man from the Alamo (1953) - (uncredited) (final film role)

TV shows
 The Gene Autry Show (1951–1952) - Matt Nixon / Lawyer Latimer
 The Cisco Kid (1951–1952) - Joe Wallace / Henchman Larry / Jed Haskell
 Boston Blackie (1952)
 The Lone Ranger (1952–1953) - Frank Carlson / Hilton McCabe / Sheriff Jim Lake / Jim Arnold / Jeb Logan / Amos Carter / Stan Beeler / Henchman

References

Sources
Saturday Afternoon At The Movies: 3 in 1 – Alan G. Barbour. Publisher: Random House Value Publishing, 1987. Format: Hardcover, 568pp. Language: English. 
In the Nick of Time: Motion Picture Sound Serials –  William C. Cline. Publisher: McFarland & Company, 1997.  Format: Paperback: 293pp. Language: English. 
Serials and Series: A World Filmography, 1912-1956 – Buck Rainey. Publisher: McFarland & Company, 1999. Format: Hardcover, 321pp. Language: English. 
To Be Continued – Ken Weiss, Edwin Goodgold. Publisher: Bonanza Books, 1972. Format: Paperback,	341 pages. Language: English.

External links

1907 births
1952 deaths
American male film actors
American male television actors
20th-century American male actors
Road incident deaths in New Mexico
Burials at Rose Hills Memorial Park